Mukura Victory Sports et Loisirs Football Club, commonly known as Mukura Victory Sports or simply Mukura, is an association football club from Butare (a city sometimes known as Huye), Rwanda. Founded in May 1963, the club currently competes in the Rwanda Premier League and plays its home games at Stade Huye.

Mukura victory sports et Loisirs football club in February had stopped APR FC 51 unbeaten games in Rwanda premier league.

History
They won the Rwandan Cup on August 12, 2018 after beating Rayon Sports (3-1) on penalty shootout. The regular time had ended on 0-0 draw.

Honours

Domestic competitions
Rwanda National Football League:
Runners-up (3): 1992, 1998, 1999
Rwandan Cup:
Winners (5): 1978, 1986, 1990, 1992, 2018
Runners-up (4): 1987, 1999, 2005, 2009

Performance in CAF & CECAFA competitions

CAF competitions

CECAFA competitions

Current squad

Technical Staff

Management

Youth academy squad
Mukura have been helping a number of young players of the region to become big names in the country. Among them the former Captain Nshimiyimana Canisius who is the Assistant Coach in the club. Mukura Youth System is made of more than 45 young players from the age of 11 to 18. Gashugi Abdul Kareem,(brother of Mukura former midfielder Djuma Munyaneza) currently playing for Kiyovu SC is another talented product of Mukura Youth System.

Stadium
The Home of Mukura V.S, Stade Huye is located near the office of Huye District next the national road 1. The 10,000 all-seater stadium hosted the Group B matches of the 2016 CHAN.It was constructed in collaboration with Rwanda Ministry of Sports and Culture and Huye District. It comprises offices, dressing rooms and sports museum.

References

External links
Mukura Victory Sport
http://ruhagoyacu.com/spip.php?article6359
https://web.archive.org/web/20131203005252/http://www.huye.gov.rw/index.php?id=2261&tx_ttnews%5Btt_news%5D=4000&cHash=7ebdef762a6abf5a11a71fd1c5909145

Football clubs in Rwanda
Association football clubs established in 1963
1963 establishments in Rwanda